The place name "Sawatch" found in the Southern Rocky Mountains of North America is pronounced .  This name derives from the Ute language noun "sawup" meaning "sand dunes".  The Spanish language version of this name found in the San Luis Closed Basin is usually spelled "Saguache", while the English language version found north of the basin is usually spelled "Sawatch".

Places named Sawatch

United States
Great Sand Dunes National Park and Preserve, Colorado, United States
Saguache, Colorado, United States
Saguache County, Colorado, United States
Saguache Creek, Colorado, United States
Saguache Peak, Colorado, United States
Sawatch Mountains, Colorado, United States
Sawatch Range, Colorado, United States
Sawatch Uplift, Colorado, United States